Meza is the name of several rural localities in Kostroma Oblast, Russia.

Modern localities
Meza, Raslovskoye Settlement, Sudislavsky District, Kostroma Oblast, a railway station in Raslovskoye Settlement of Sudislavsky District; 
Meza, Sudislavskoye Settlement, Sudislavsky District, Kostroma Oblast, a village in Sudislavskoye Settlement of Sudislavsky District;

Abolished localities
Meza, Kostromskoy District, Kostroma Oblast, a khutor in Kuznetsovsky Selsoviet of Kostromskoy District; abolished on May 27, 2004

References

Notes

Sources